John McCauley was a member of the RAAF.

John McCauley may also refer to:

John McCauley (referee)
John McCauley (American Revolutionary War), American Revolutionary War veteran
John McCauley, American singer in Deer Tick (band)
John McCauley (judge), a judge of the Ohio Supreme Court Commission
John W. McCauley (virologist), UK director of the Worldwide Influenza Centre at the Francis Crick Institute